Neighbours (French title: Voisins) is a 1952 anti-war film by Scottish-Canadian filmmaker Norman McLaren for the National Film Board of Canada. In 1953, it won the Oscar for Best Documentary, Short Subject.

Production
The film uses pixilation, an animation technique using live actors as stop motion objects. McLaren created the soundtrack of the film by scratching the edge of the film, creating various blobs, lines, and triangles which the projector read as sound.

Plot
Two men, Jean-Paul Ladouceur and Grant Munro (representing French Canada and English Canada respectively), live peacefully in adjacent cardboard houses. When a single, small flower (possibly a psychoactive flower) blooms between their houses, they fight each other to the death over ownership of that flower.

The moral of the film is, simply, Love your neighbour. The moral is also shown in other languages, including (in order of appearance):
Japanese: 同胞に親切なれ (Dōhō ni shinsetsu nare)
Chinese: 親善鄰居 (Qīnshàn línjū)
Hindi: आपके पड़ोसी से प्रेम पूर्वक व्यवहार कीजिए (Aapke parosii ke prem porvak vyavahaar kiijie)
Urdu: اپنے ہمساءے دوستانی برتاؤ کرؤ (Aapne hamsaae dostaani bartaao karo)
Arabic: اَحِب قَرِيبَك (Ahib qaribak)
Hebrew: וְאָהַבְתָּ לְרֵעֲךָ (V'ahavta l'reacha)
Russian: Любите ближнего своего; Lyubite blizhnego svoyego
Esperanto: Amu vian najbaron
Norwegian: Elsk din nabo
Spanish: Ama a tu prójimo
German: Liebe deinen Nächsten
Italian: Amate il prossimo
French: Aimez votre prochain

Cast 
 Jean-Paul Ladouceur as himself
 Grant Munro as himself

Controversy
Neighbours has been described as "one of the most controversial films the NFB ever made". The eight-minute film was politically motivated:

"I was inspired to make Neighbours by a stay of almost a year in the People's Republic of China. Although I only saw the beginnings of Mao's revolution, my faith in human nature was reinvigorated by it. Then I came back to Quebec and the Korean War began. (...) I decided to make a really strong film about anti-militarism and against war." — Norman McLaren 

The version of Neighbours that ultimately won an Oscar was not the version McLaren had originally created. In order to make the film palatable for American and European audiences, McLaren was required to remove a scene in which the two men, fighting over the flower, murdered the other's wife and children.

During the Vietnam War, public opinion changed, and McLaren was asked to reinstate the sequence. The original negative of that scene had been destroyed, so the scene was salvaged from a positive print of lower quality.

NFB founder John Grierson, who had invited McLaren to the NFB to form its first animation unit, would ultimately disparage Neighbours and McLaren's attempt at political cinema:

"I wouldn't trust Norman around the corner as a political thinker. I wouldn't trust Norman around the corner as a philosophic thinker. That's not what Norman is for. Norman is for Hen Hop. Hen Hop. That's wonderful. And so many other things. That's his basic gift. He's got joy in his movement. He's got loveliness in his movement. He's got fancy in his changes. That's enough."

Pixilation
The term 'pixilation' was created by Grant Munro to describe stop-motion animation of humans in his work with McLaren on Two Bagatelles, a pair of short pixilation films made prior to Neighbours. During one brief sequence, the two actors appear to levitate, an effect achieved by having the actors repeatedly jump upward and photographing them at the top of their trajectories.

McLaren followed Neighbours with two other films using a similar combination of pixilation, live action, variable speed photography and string puppets. The first, A Chairy Tale (1957) was a collaboration with Claude Jutra and Ravi Shankar. The second, Opening Speech by Norman McLaren (1960) was made for the International Film Festival of Montreal, and starred McLaren himself.

Wolf Koenig served as cameraman on the film.

Awards
 25th Academy Awards, Los Angeles: Oscar for Best Documentary, Short Subject, 1953*
 Boston Film Festival, Boston: Award of Merit, Adult Education, 1953
 5th Canadian Film Awards, Montreal: Honourable Mention, 1953
 Salerno Film Festival, Salerno, Italy: Gulf of Salerno Grand Trophy, 1954
 Yorkton Film Festival, Yorkton, Saskatchewan: Third Award, Sociology, 1954
 International Review of Specialized Cinematography, Rome: Certificate of Honour, 1955
 International Review of Specialized Cinematography, Rome: Diploma of Honour, 1957
 Golden Gate International Film Festival, San Francisco: Redwood Award for Special Merit, Film as Communication, 1967
 Calvin Workshop Awards, Kansas City, Missouri: Notable Film Award, 1968
 25th Academy Awards, Los Angeles: Nominee: Best Live Action, Short Subject, 1953

(*A 2005 press release issued by AMPAS states that Neighbours is "among a group of films that not only competed, but won Academy Awards in what were clearly inappropriate categories".)

Honours
Neighbours was designated as a "masterwork" by the Audio-Visual Preservation Trust of Canada, a charitable non-profit organization dedicated to promoting the preservation of Canada's audio-visual heritage.

In 2009, Neighbours was added to UNESCO's Memory of the World Programme, listing the most significant documentary heritage collections in the world.

See also
History of Canadian animation
List of stop-motion films
Academy Award for Best Documentary (Short Subject)
List of Canadian films
List of Quebec films
Rest in Peace (song), the music video from Extreme that was inspired from the film

References

External links
 
 
 

1952 films
Quebec films
Films without speech
1950s animated short films
Stop-motion animated short films
Canadian animated short films
Films directed by Norman McLaren
Best Documentary Short Subject Academy Award winners
Films shot in Montreal
National Film Board of Canada animated short films
Anti-war films
Graphical sound
Memory of the World Register
1952 animated films
Pixilation films
Animated films without speech
Films about drugs
1950s Canadian films